In Scientology, the concept of the thetan is similar to the concept of self, or the spirit or soul. A body thetan or a BT is a disincarnate thetan who is "stuck" in, on or near a human body, and all human bodies are said to be infested by these disembodied thetans, or clusters of them.

Scientologists believe body thetans came about approximately 75 million years ago through a  catastrophe brought on by a galactic dictator named Xenu, as described by L. Ron Hubbard in a confidential auditing (counseling level in Scientology) called OT III.

High-level Scientologists are told that body thetans are responsible for physical and mental ailments, and are told to telepathically exorcize them using Scientology auditing processes.

Free Will
According to Hubbard, body thetans cling to a body because they have lost their free will as a result of events in their past. There are several Scientology auditing "processes" which are believed to help a body thetan restore free will. Upon reaching OT III, the individual finds body thetans by locating any sensation of pressure or mass in his or her body. This is addressed telepathically as a "cluster," and taken through the cluster-making incident of 75 million years ago.

Secrecy
Often members of the Church of Scientology will publicly deny the existence of space opera doctrines, or attempt to minimize their importance. Because the secret information imparted to members is to be kept secret from others who have not attained that level, the member must publicly deny its existence when asked. OT III recipients must sign a waiver promising never to reveal its secrets before they are given the manila envelope containing the body thetan knowledge.
It is supposedly knowledge so dangerous, as noted on the "Ron's Journal 67" cassette, that anyone learning this material before he is ready could die though many have learned the story and remain alive.

Despite the church's efforts to keep the story secret, details have been leaked over the years. OT III was first revealed in Robert Kaufman's 1972 book  Inside Scientology: Or How I Found Scientology and Became Super Human, in which Kaufman detailed his own experiences of OT III. It was later described in a 1981 Clearwater Sun article by Richard Leiby, and came to greater public fame in a 1985 court case brought against the church by Lawrence A. Wollersheim. The church attempted to keep the case file checked out by a reader at all times, but the story was synopsised in the Los Angeles Times on November 5, 1985, and later detailed in William Poundstone's Bigger Secrets (1986) from information presented in the Wollersheim case. Church lawyer Warren McShane later claimed the story had never been secret, although maintaining there were nevertheless trade secrets contained in OT III. Notably, McShane discussed the details of the Xenu/body thetans story at some length and specifically attributed the authorship of the story to Hubbard. Audio recordings exist of Hubbard lectures that discuss body thetans and other space opera subjects.

There is little real problem verifying information concerning Scientology practices at Clear and above despite all the materials being strictly confidential. While it's therefore sometimes necessary to resort to secondary sources such as court documents, leaked copies of the material and/or second-hand accounts from former members. While almost all of the leaked material seems to be credible and has been verified by ex-members, the possibility exists that while procedures and policies may have changed, the underlying theology from Hubbard will remain the same.

There is therefore credible evidence that such materials should not be disclosed by parishioners, but there is currently no documentary evidence of policy requiring anyone to lie about the contents of the materials. Whilst there is ample video evidence of apparently devout members lying about the contents of the OT courses, there is uncertainty as to why they feel it is both necessary and ethical to do so.

See also
 Scientology beliefs and practices

References

External links 
 
OT III Course, summary and comments

Scientology beliefs and practices